The Department of Trade was an Australian government department that existed between March 1983 and July 1987. It was the second so-named Australian Government Department.

History
The department was dissolved in July 1987 as part of a large overhaul of the Public Service that reduced the number of departments from 28 to 17.

Scope
Information about the department's functions and/or government funding allocation could be found in the Administrative Arrangements Orders, the annual Portfolio Budget Statements and in the department's annual reports.

At the department's creation it was responsible for:
Trade and Commerce with other countries in particular-
Bilateral and Multilateral trade policy. 
Trade promotion and services. 
Trade agreements. 
Export services.

Structure
The department was a Commonwealth Public Service department, staffed by officials who were responsible to the Minister for Trade.

References

Trade
Ministries established in 1983
1983 establishments in Australia
1987 disestablishments in Australia